F-box only protein 7 is a protein that in humans is encoded by the FBXO7 gene. Mutations in FBXO7 have been associated with Parkinson's disease.

Function 

This gene encodes a member of the F-box protein family which is characterized by an approximately 40 amino acid motif, the F-box. The F-box proteins constitute one of the four subunits of the ubiquitin protein ligase complex called SCFs (SKP1-cullin-F-box), which function in phosphorylation-dependent ubiquitination. The F-box proteins are divided into 3 classes: Fbws containing WD-40 domains, Fbls containing leucine-rich repeats, and Fbxs containing either different protein-protein interaction modules or no recognizable motifs. The protein encoded by this gene belongs to the Fbxs class and it may play a role in regulation of hematopoiesis. Alternatively spliced transcript variants of this gene have been identified with the full-length natures of only some variants being determined.

Interactions 

FBXO7 has been shown to interact with SKP1A, CUL1, CDK6, p27, PI31, Parkin, and PINK1.

References

Further reading